Venice is an unincorporated community in Shannon County, in the U.S. state of Missouri. The community is located on Missouri Route 19, northwest of Eminence and south of Round Spring.

History
A post office called Venice was established in 1913, and remained in operation until 1933. The name was selected from an early postmaster's reading material.

References

Unincorporated communities in Shannon County, Missouri
Unincorporated communities in Missouri